Huayanay may refer to:

 Mount Huayanay, mountain in Peru
 Huayanay, Huancavelica, village in Anta District, Acobamba, Acobamba Province, Huancavelica Region, Peru
 Huayanay case, criminal case in the village of Huayanay, Huancavelica
 El caso de Huayanay, Peruvian movie